The Embassy of Sweden in Tokyo is Sweden's diplomatic mission in Japan. The mission was opened in 1906. It's located in the Roppongi district in Minato, Tokyo since 1959. The current embassy building was inaugurated in 1991. The ambassador since 2019 is Pereric Högberg. The ambassador has a dual accreditation to Marshall Islands, the Federated States of Micronesia and Palau.

History
Diplomatic relations between Sweden and Japan were established in 1868. A Swedish legation in Japan was established in 1906 after Sweden had previously been represented by Dutch diplomats. The shipowner Gustaf Oscar Wallenberg became the first Swedish envoy and he focused on developing trade during a time when Sweden was very unknown in Japan. Both Sweden and Japan raised the status of their missions to embassies in 1957.

From at least 1914, the address of the legation was 24 Tsukiji, Tokyo. Between 1920 and 1930 the legation in Tokyo moved almost every year: In 1920, the address was 44 Sakurada-cho Azabu, Tokyo, in 1921 the address was Azabu 25 Mikawadaimachi, Tokyo, in 1922 the address was 22 Kasumicho Azabu, Tokyo, in 1923 the address was 15 Kaminibanchô, Köjimachiku, Tokyo, 1924–1927 the address was 67 Tansumachi, Azabu-ku, Tokyo, 1928–1929 the address was 52 Hikawacho Akasaka-ku, Tokyo, and in 1930 it moved to 63 Zaimoku-cho, Azabu-ku, Tokyo where it remained until 1937. From 1938, the address was 22 Nishi-machi, Azabu-ku, Tokyo. In the 1930s, a group of Swedish businessmen were dissatisfied with the Swedish representation in Japan and collected almost SEK 500,000 so that the Swedish state could buy a plot of land in Roppongi, Tokyo. This was materialised when a new embassy was inaugurated in Roppongi in 1959. Until 1959 the residence was located at 22 Nishi-machi, Azabu, Minato-ku and the chancery was located at »Kikai Boeki Kaikan», rooms 505 & 506, No. 3, 7-chome, Tamachi, Akasaka, Minato-ku. The address from 1 June 1959 was Azabu-Ichibeicho, Minato-ku.

The embassy has been located in the same place in Roppongi since 1959 when the Swedish government received the land as a gift from a group of Swedish representatives. From the 1968, address was 3-go, 10-ban, 1-chome, Roppongi, Minato-ku. In the 1980s, part of the plot was sold and thus a new embassy needed to be built. The new and current embassy was inaugurated in 1991. The embassy is located in the Shiroyama Hills and has a terrace-shaped structure that sweeps up from two floors in an arch to a height of nine floors. The building comprises premises for the chancery, residence, trade office and an office for the Swedish Agency for Growth Policy Analysis, Growth Analysis (Myndigheten för tillväxtpolitiska utvärderingar och analyser, Tillväxtanalys). In addition, there are about 20 apartments, of which about half are used as housing for embassy' staff. From the autumn of 2013, external tenants will also rent offices and some apartments.

Buildings

Chancery

In the 1950s, Professor Nils Ahrbom was commissioned to design the first permanent embassy and he traveled to Tokyo in 1955 to inspect the site. He had with him a sketch that was approved by the National Swedish Board of Public Building (Byggnadsstyrelsen) and the Ministry for Foreign Affairs. In the garden there were some old and now culturally listed ginkgo trees that were allowed to control the location of the buildings. The first embassy was inaugurated in 1959. In step with the expansive economic development in Japan, land prices rose considerably in this central area, which was rather sparsely populated. In the mid-1980s, the embassy was contacted by the neighbor Mori Building Development Co., Ltd. which is one of Japan's largest real estate companies. They wanted to discuss a renewal of the area, make a more economical development with the integration of housing and offices according to Tokyo's city plan program. In order to implement this and still maintain the park character, certain interventions were required. The Swedish embassy was partly in the way of the intended new plan. Mori Building offered the Swedish state SEK 1.2 billion to take over a larger part of the garden, including the historic trees, to make this part of a park and a walkway adjacent to their planned office building and residential buildings. The agreement meant that the embassy had to be demolished and a new one built next to it. Professor Michael Granit, who had participated in the discussions on the city plan issue, was hired as the architect for the new embassy building. The architect Yoshito Katoh from Irie Miyake Architects was hired as a Japanese partner. All drawings were translated into Japanese, the dialogue worked well, but the most important partner for Granit for the design of the building, garden and terraces was the sculptor Sivert Lindblom. The 11,000 square meter facility was inaugurated in 1991.

Between the street and the entrances to the chancery, residence and accommodations, the courtyard is paved with small paving stones in a pattern that associates with hand fans. The vision was to create a contrast between the façade's red  and the classic dark gray paving stone as a Swedish greeting, but the Japanese construction company did not have this reference and ordered domestic light gray stones. The chancery with the trade department and office for technical attachés is housed on the entrance level and on the 2nd floor. The environment is characterized by the Swedish standard that was developed in connection with the rebuilding of the Parliament House in Stockholm. In the conference room there is a decoration by Margareta Hallek in the form of a red textile. In contrast to it and the red stone of the façade, Kicken Ericson has created a carpet with a green and earth-colored pattern. A carpet which is used in all rooms with different results. The 25 staff accommodation units are located in the curved rising building on floors four to seven. Characteristic of all accommodations is the system of visible or invisible supporting pillars. Their task is to strengthen the structure to avoid the risk of collapse in the event of an earthquake. There is also a recreation facility with a pool. There is an upper and a lower basement which both contain different parts of the recreation facility. The pool is located in the basement and is surrounded by a teak deck. It has direct access to its own small garden. There is also a Japanese bath and a sauna. The garden feeling is enhanced by Åke Pallarp's marbled green murals and the trellis decoration on the tiled pillars. In the lower basement, in addition to the garage, there is also a squash court.

Residence
The residence is surrounded by a terrace garden which includes a small bridge over to a Japanese garden. The ambassadorial residence is located as a two-storey villa on top of the chancery's two floors. The boundary between the private quarters and the representative part is a counterclockwise curved staircase. Externally, the stairs is visible in the villa's oval roof section. Characteristic of all accommodations, including the residence, is the system of visible or invisible supporting pillars. Their task is to strengthen the structure to avoid the risk of collapse in the event of an earthquake. In the representative part of the residence, these pillars are built into the walls – in the walls of the square living room and in the four corners of the dining room. The residence is reached via a separate entrance where Axel Munthe's large textile Dalagång gives the visitor an introduction to an environment that summarizes seven decades of Swedish interior design art – from 1920s neoclassicism to the late 1980s postmodernism. The walls of the hallway are clad with curly birch panels and in its extension has a view through the atrium and the small dining room to the terrace. The salon has the same dimensions as the large salon at Ulriksdal Palace north of Stockholm. The interior designer Mats Jacobson has been responsible for the interior.

The almost square room has been furnished with three 'islands', four groups of seating arrangements gathered around low tables and between them a spacious space that through the large glass doors also incorporates the conservatory – the terrace. Kicken Ericson has specially composed a carpet for the room with a tight Trompe-l'œil pattern. The furniture otherwise follows a well-known pattern with soft sofas from Svenskt Tenn and tighter sofas by Lars and Pi Norinder as well as a modernized version of the so-called Gripsholmsstolen ("Gripsholm chair"). The art has a similar range from Einar Jolin's Stockholmsmotiv, Felix Hatz's Vissnande solrosor, Hans Viksten's Ljussegel to Barbro Lind's Segelbåt i vik. There is also a selection of contemporary glass art by well-known designers from Orrefors, Kosta Boda and Skruf. There is also a library with a cocklestove from Marieberg. Directly adjacent to the library is a white plastered hall with the curved stairs up to the private quarters. The large dining room is furnished with classic furniture designed by Lennart Jansson. A work of art by Peter Dahl with motifs by Carl Michael Bellman's "Movitz blåste en konsert" dominates the stage as well as selected parts from the lithograph series Bellman. Kicken Ericson has designed the carpets. The small dining room's two glass walls, one facing the terrace and the other facing the atrium, and Åke Pallarp's ceramic walls give a feeling of a glass veranda.

Bergman Exhibition Hall
The Bergman Exhibition Hall is located on the first floor, directly adjacent to the main entrance. The room is 138 m2 and has access to both kitchen and toilets. The Bergman Exhibition Hall has a maximum capacity of 200 people. Exhibitions are occasionally arranged in the exhibition hall in order to promote Swedish exports.

Alfred Nobel Auditorium

Next to the Bergman Exhibition Hall is the Alfred Nobel Auditorium. The room is designed as an amphitheater with 96 seats. The auditorium is equipped with a sound and projection system, a simultaneous interpretation booth and has access to toilets.

Heads of Mission

References

Further reading

External links

 
 
 

Tokyo
Sweden
Japan–Sweden relations
Buildings and structures in Minato, Tokyo
Roppongi
1906 establishments in Japan